Matilde is an alternate spelling of the name Matilda and may refer to:

People
Matilde Borromeo (born 1983), Italian equestrian
Matilde Camus (1919–2012), Spanish poet
Matilde Casazola (born 1942), Bolivian songwriter 
Matilde Fernández (born 1950), Spanish feminist and politician
Matilde Hidalgo (1889–1974), Ecuadorian politician
Matilde Ladrón de Guevara (1910–2009), Chilean poet
Matilde E. Moisant (1878–1964), American aviator
Matilde Sánchez (born 1958), Argentine journalist
Matilde Serao (1856–1927), Italian journalist
Matilde Urrutia (1912–1985)
Matilde Zimmermann (born 1943), American author and professor

Other
Matilde di Shabran (1821)
Santa Matilde (1977–1997)

References

See also
 Mathilde (disambiguation)

Feminine given names
Latvian feminine given names